Rollie Cook (born c. 1936) was a Canadian football player who played for the Edmonton Eskimos. He won the Grey Cup with the Eskimos in 1955 and 1956. Born in Edmonton, Alberta., he previously played football with the London, Ontario Royal Canadian Air Force team. Cook lives in White Rock, British Columbia where he is the president of the White Rock Lawn Bowling Club.

References

1930s births
Living people
Edmonton Elks players
Sportspeople from Chatham-Kent